Savages is a 1972 Merchant Ivory Film directed by James Ivory and screenplay by George W. S. Trow and Michael O'Donoghue, based on an idea by Ivory.
 
The film concept given to Trow and O'Donoghue was to tell a story that was the reverse of Luis Buñuel's 1962 film The Exterminating Angel, in which guests at an elegant dinner party become bestial. Writing began in late 1968 and continued through 1969. Its first showing came at the Cannes Film Festival in May 1972.

Synopsis
In contrast to Buñuel's story, Savages starts when a tribe of primitive "mudpeople" performing a sacrifice encounter a croquet ball, rolling through their forest. Following it, they find themselves on a vast, deserted Westchester estate in the 1930s.

Entering, they begin to become civilized and assume the stereotypical roles and dress of people at a weekend party. There follows an allegory of upper-class behavior. At last, they begin to devolve toward their original status, and after a battle at croquet, they disappear into the woods.

Reception
Matt Brunson noted that Savages is an "intriguing short-film idea stretched out to feature length, worth a glance primarily as an artifact of its time." Variety noted that "the playing has flair and grace."

Release
This film has been released on DVD in 2004 as part of the Merchant-Ivory Collection produced by Criterion.

Sources
 Mr. Mike: The Life and Work of Michael O'Donoghue by Dennis Perrin, 1999. .

See also
 List of American films of 1972

References

External links
 Merchant Ivory Productions
 Cannes Film Festival
 

1972 comedy films
1972 films
Surreal comedy films
American comedy films
Films directed by James Ivory
Merchant Ivory Productions films
American satirical films
Films with screenplays by Michael O'Donoghue
Films scored by Joe Raposo
1970s English-language films
1970s American films